Castor & Pollux was launched at Teignmouth in 1790. Initially she traded with the Mediterranean, and on one voyage suffered a fire at sea. She then became a West Indiaman. In 1799 she commenced a voyage as a whaler. A Spanish privateer captured her in the Pacific circa 1801.

Career
Castor & Pollux first appeared in the Lloyd's Register (LR) volume for 1791.

Lloyd's List reported in September 1792 that Castor & Polleux, Codner, master, had been returning from Manfredonia when she caught fire at sea. Her captain and crew ran her onshore at Alicant to extinguish the fire.

War with France broke out early in 1793. Captain William Codner acquired a letter of marque on 30 April 1794.

Captain John Godwin acquired a letter of marque on 3 April 1795.

On 21 March 1799 Castor & Pollux, Anderson, master, was at Deal, waiting to sail for the South Seas. In February 1800 Castor & Pollux called in at Rio de Janeiro in want of refreshments and repairs.

Fate
In May 1801 Lloyd's List reported that a Spanish ship of 24 guns had captured ", late Mortlock, of London", and Castor & Pollux, Anderson, master, in the Galapagos Islands. The Spaniards then took their prizes into Lima. Their captor was the privateer Atlante, under the command of Dominque de Orué.

Citations

References
 
 

1790 ships
Age of Sail merchant ships of England
Maritime incidents in 1792
Whaling ships
Captured ships